Thelesperma is a genus of North American and South American plants in the cosmos tribe within the sunflower family. Greenthread is a common name for plants in this genus.

Members of the genus are used by a number of the southwestern Native American peoples as an herbal tea; as such, it is sometimes called "Indian tea," "Native American tea," "Native tea," or the name is referenced to the local tribe where the tea was harvested such as "Apache tea," Pueblo tea," "Navajo tea," "Hopi tea," etc. T. megapotamicum contains luteolin. It also appears that many of the species contain a very similar chromatographic profile, and thus may contain very similar profiles of flavenoids. The genus is closely related to parts of Coreopsis and to certain North American Bidens species (including Bidens coronata and Bidens comosa).

 Species
 Thelesperma ambiguum  - TX NM 
 Thelesperma burridgeanum  - TX 
 Thelesperma filifolium - Coahuila, Nuevo León, AZ NM TX LA MS AL AR MO OK KS CO WY NE SD
 Thelesperma flavodisum - TX LA AR
 Thelesperma graminiformis  - 	Nuevo León
 Thelesperma longipes - Coahuila, Nuevo León, Tamaulipas, San Luis Potosí, AZ NM TX
 Thelesperma megapotamicum - Argentina, Chihuahua, Coahuila, Nuevo León, CA OR AZ NM TX UT CO KS MO WY SD MN IL IN MI
 Thelesperma muelleri  - Nuevo León
 Thelesperma nuecense - TX 
 Thelesperma scabridulum  - Nuevo León
 Thelesperma simplicifolium  - NM TX Coahuila, Nuevo León, Tamaulipas, Durango, Zacatecas
 Thelesperma subaequale  - Nuevo León
 Thelesperma subnudum - ALB SAS ND MT WY CO NM UT NV AZ
 Thelesperma subsimplicifolium

References

External links

Coreopsideae
Asteraceae genera